Yasser Hussein Al-Fahmi (born 20 December 1991) is a Saudi professional footballer who currently plays as an attacking midfielder .

Club career

Early career
Fahmi was born in Mecca, Saudi Arabia in 1991. At the age of thirteen he played Al-Hara Club until 2009 he signed with Al-Ahli Club.

Al-Ahli
Yasser Al-Fahmi joined Al-Ahli club as a youth player. He spent 8 years at the club and helped Al-Ahli win the Saudi Federation Cup and the King Cup of Champions, among many other achievements. He played an instrumental role in Al-Ahli's run in the 2012 AFC Champions League where the club reached the final. However, during a friendly against Al-Qadsia in August 2012 he suffered an ACL and spent six months on the sideline.

Al-Qadsiah
On 31 August 2022, Al-Fahmi joined Al-Qadsiah.

International career
He played for Saudi Arabia U-20 as in 2010 AFC U-19 Championship and 2011 FIFA U-20 World Cup.

2010 AFC U-19 Championship 2010
He scored his first goal for the national team in the AFC U-19 Championship 2010 against Syria U-20 in the 41st Minute and they won by a score of 1-0,although they lost the Semi-final versus Australia U-20 2-0.

2011 FIFA U-20 World Cup
His first goal in the FIFA U-20 world championships was scored against Croatia U-20 after 54 minutes, and they won the game 2-0. His second came against Guatemala U-20 within 24 minutes, they won score is 6-0 but they were finally knocked out in the Last 16 by Brazil U-20 0 goals to 3.

AFC U-22 Asian Cup 2013

International goals

Under-20

Under-23

Club career statistics

Honours

Club
With Al-Ahli (Jeddah)

Winners
Saudi Federation Cup: 2012.
King Cup of Champions: 2012.

Runner-Up
Saudi Federation Cup: 2011.
Saudi Professional League: 2012.

National team career statistics
2010 AFC U-19 Championship: Semi-finals.
2011 FIFA U-20 World Cup: 16 Round.

Individual
Best Saudi Promising player: 2011-12.

References

1991 births
Living people
Heraa FC players
Al-Ahli Saudi FC players
Al-Wehda Club (Mecca) players
Al Batin FC players
Jeddah Club players
Ohod Club players
Al-Qadsiah FC players
Saudi Arabia youth international footballers
Sportspeople from Mecca
Saudi Professional League players
Saudi First Division League players
Association football midfielders
Saudi Arabian footballers